Pachokhara is a village in the Madhogarh taluka of Jalaun district in Uttar Pradesh, India. As of the 2011 Indian census, it had a population of 1,377.

References

Villages in Jalaun district